Gordon Leroy Soltau (born January 25, 1925, in Duluth, Minnesota) was a wide receiver who played nine seasons in the National Football League for the San Francisco 49ers. His all around athletic versatility was developed as a youth growing up in Duluth, Minnesota, where he excelled in many sports: football, baseball, track, even hockey and skiing. Being inspired by University of Minnesota All-American halfback George Frank, Gordy gravitated towards football. During the middle of World War II when Gordy graduated from high school he enlisted in the United States Navy and was part of the Navy's first class of frogmen (The Navy Seals today) specializing in underwater demolition. He saw action in Europe and behind the lines in the Pacific. Coming out of the Navy in 1945 Gordy enrolled in University of Minnesota. Under his role model football coach, Bernie Bierman, Gordy developed into a talented receiver, place kicker and learned the skills to also be a threat on defense. Gordy Soltau became one of the school's legendary football figures. He was named to the "All Big Ten" team. He played in the Hula Bowl, the East-West Shrine game and on the college all stars team that beat the champion Philadelphia Eagles in 1950. He made the Minnesota Hall of Fame and the Duluth Hall of Fame.

It was 1950, and the San Francisco 49ers were starting their first year in the NFL when Gordy Soltau was hired by Coach Buck Shaw as a wide receiver and place kicker. The prior season the 49ers had played in the All-American Conference. Shaw's job was to field a team that could compete with the longer and well established teams in the NFL, like the Los Angeles Rams. Gordy filled the bill in two areas as he was both a place kicker and wide receiver as well as could play offense and defense. Gordy was the 27th draft pick out of the University of Minnesota, chosen by the Green Bay Packers who traded him right away to the Cleveland Browns, who in turn dealt him to the 49ers. In 1952 and 1953 he led the NFL in scoring. During his nine seasons as a 49er he led the team in scoring with 644 points, 25 touchdowns, and 70 field goals. He was All-Pro in 1952, 1953, and 1954.

Additionally during this time in professional football most players had to have an outside job to survive the off-season. Gordy, in 1954, went to work as a sales rep. for Schwabacher/Frey, a San Francisco printing, stationery and office supply company. The firm was bought out by Diamond International, makers of Diamond matches, packaging material, folding cartons and corrugated. Their other interests included saw mills, lumber, and building supplies. Gordy rose to vice president in charge of sales for the West Coast and was executive vice president when he retired.

Off the field Gordy was a pioneer in advancing benefits for NFL football players. He was the first player representative for the 49ers. There were only 12 teams in the league in 1954. Many players had some issues with the owners and wanted to start a "Players Association". The owners objected, particularly the ones from the oldest teams in the league, even threatening to cut players who participated. However, in 1954 a representative from each of the six younger teams in the league had their first meeting in Philadelphia. The teams were the Detroit Lions, Chicago Bears, Washington Redskins, New York Giants, and the 49ers, represented by Gordy. Bert Bell, commissioner of the league, was invited but didn't come. There were three major issues on the table.

The league should establish a pension plan.
Players should be paid for exhibition games during training.
Team owners should provide playing shoes. In 1954 players had to furnish their own shoes.
Word got around that players were meeting and wanted to establish a dialogue with the owners. This was the beginning of a Players Association. Dues were $25.00 a year per player. Gordy persuaded 49er's owner, Tony Moribato, to deduct it from the players' checks. The rest of the teams refused and the reps had to chase players who hadn't paid around the locker room, in their favorite bar or in the parking lot to collect the $25.00. Gordy for his work as a players' rep got the nickname "The Senator". (He did become a member of "Athletes for Reagan" during Ronnie's first run for governor in 1966.)

It took 4 years to get the owners to talk about the issues. It wasn't until 1962 that the owners put money in a pension plan. The Players Association gradually disintegrated. Then in the early sixties Vic Matland, a close friend to Art Rooney (owner of the Pittsburgh Steelers) came up with a plan and the philosophy "Caring For Kids" that owners could live with. The Players Association changed this to "The NFL Alumni Association.

Gordy played a major role along with Alyn Beals, Eddie Forest, Bruce Bosley and Norm Standee in establishing The Northern California Chapter of the NFL Alumni Association. He was the chapter's first president and has been golf chairman of the chapter's main fund raising event since 1981. The golf tournament is played each year at the prestigious Olympic Club in San Francisco.

Gordy retired from the 49er's in 1959 and soon was inducted into The Bay Area Sports Hall of Fame. He then spent ten years as a color commentator with Bob Fouts at CBS television. His next gig was five years at KSFO with Lon Simmons. He is an avid golfer and played in ten of Bing Crosby's Celebrity Pro-Ams at Pebble Beach. He was a friend of Bing's and has some great Crosby stories like the following.

During the 1960 winter Olympic Winter Games in Squaw Valley, Gordy along with Lon Simmons, Russ Hodges and Marty Martin were broadcasting the games over the Olympic Radio Special created by Franklin Mieuli, a producer as well as owner of the Warriors' basketball team. Here Gordy ran into Bing Crosby; and after partying most of the night at the Squaw Valley Lodge with Bing singing to the patrons, Gordy talked him into coming the next day to help Gordy and Lon Simmons broadcast the final hockey game. (Crosby was supposed to be in Stockton, CA., filming "High Time").

Today Gordy lives with his wife, Nancy, in Menlo Park, California. His daughter, Jill, worked twenty-five years for Hewlett Packard and is now retired. His son, John, is a packaging designer and his other son, Mark, is a journalist for Golf Digest. Mark from his days at Stanford University knows Tiger Woods and created Tiger's website when he turned professional.

More in-depth information can be read about Gordy in Dennis Georgatos' new book "Game of My Life, San Francisco 49ers, Memorable Stories of 49er Football".

Career highlights: scored 26 points in victory over the Rams in 1951, which was the 49er single game scoring record that stood for 39 years until broken by Jerry Rice; caught 10 passes for 190 yards against the Giants in 1952; kicked four field goals against the Rams to win 33–30 in 1956. Served as a color commentator on 49ers TV broadcasts in the 1960s. Enshrined in the Bay Area Sports Hall of Fame in 1999. The NFL Alumni Northern California Chapter added a special award to their 27th Annual Charity Golf Classic, giving Gordy Soltau, Tournament Chairman, a Lifetime Achievement Award for his work over the past 27 years. In addition, San Francisco Mayor Gavin Newsom sent a proclamation form the City of San Francisco declaring Monday June 16, 2008, Gordy Soltau Day. On October 26, 2014, Soltau died at the age of 89.

References

External links

1925 births
2014 deaths
American football wide receivers
Minnesota Golden Gophers football players
National Football League announcers
Players of American football from Duluth, Minnesota
San Francisco 49ers announcers
San Francisco 49ers players
Western Conference Pro Bowl players